Beginning in 2016, Snapchat began to produce its own original content called Snap Originals.

Original programming

Comedy

Drama

Unscripted

Docuseries

Reality

Continuations
These shows have been picked up by Snapchat for additional seasons after having aired previous seasons on another network.

References

External links
 

Snap Inc.
Snapchat
Snapchat